Lithuania, after declaring restoration of independence in 1918, sent its athletes to the 1924 Summer Olympics in Paris for the first time. At first it was considered to send 33 athletes, but then it was decided to limit the delegation to 13 soccer players and 2 cyclists. The soccer players arrived in Paris only a day before the game was scheduled. Lithuania debuted at the Olympic games on May 25, 1924, at 2:40pm (Paris time) when the match between Lithuanian and Swiss teams started. Lithuania lost 9-0 (4-0). The cyclists could not finish the 188 km race because of technical difficulties.

In 1928 Summer Olympics Lithuania had 12 representatives for 4 sports: 2 boxers, 4 cyclists, and 5 athletics and one weightlifter.  Juozas Vinča achieved the best results and took 5-7 place in boxing.

In 1932 Summer Olympics in Los Angeles, Lithuania did not participate due to economic difficulties and political controversies surrounding the National Olympic Committee. In 1936 Summer Olympics in Berlin, Lithuania was not invited by Germany due to Memelland/Klaipėda region controversy. In 1940, Lithuania lost its independence to the USSR. After the war, Lithuanians participated in the Olympic games with the Soviet Union team. From 1952 to 1988, 86 Lithuanians participated in the Olympics and won 60 medals (57 in Summer and three in Winter Olympics).

Since the restoration of its independence in 1990, Lithuania has not missed any Olympic games.

Lithuania did not win any medals at the Winter Olympics.

Medal tables

Medals by Summer Games

Medals by Winter Games

Medals by summer sport

List of medalists

Summer Olympics

List of gold medal winners

Olympic participants

Summer Olympics

Winter Olympics

See also
 List of flag bearers for Lithuania at the Olympics
 :Category:Olympic competitors for Lithuania
 Lithuania at the Paralympics

External links
 
 
 
 The European Olympic Committees